Toganwala  is a village in Kapurthala district of Punjab State, India. The village is administrated by a Sarpanch who is an elected representative of village as per the constitution of India and Panchayati raj (India).

Demography 
According to the report published by Census India in 2011, Toganwala has 135 houses with the total population of 740 persons of which 376 are male and 364 females. Literacy rate of  Toganwala is 71.32%, lower than the state average of 75.84%.  The population of children in the age group 0–6 years is 102 which is 13.78% of the total population.  Child sex ratio is approximately 962, higher than the state average of 846.

Population data

References

External links
  Villages in Kapurthala
 Kapurthala Villages List

Villages in Kapurthala district